Lasianthus capitulatus is a species of plant in the family Rubiaceae. It is endemic to southern India.

References

capitulatus
Vulnerable plants
Flora of Karnataka
Flora of Kerala
Flora of Tamil Nadu
Taxonomy articles created by Polbot
Taxobox binomials not recognized by IUCN